James Henry Robert Innes-Ker, 7th Duke of Roxburghe (5 September 1839 – 23 October 1892), became Duke of Roxburghe on the death of his father, James Henry Robert Innes-Ker, 6th Duke of Roxburghe.

Early life
He was born on 5 September 1839 to James Henry Robert Innes-Ker, 6th Duke of Roxburghe and Susanna Dalbiac, Duchess of Roxburghe, only child of Sir Charles Dalbiac. His mother was one of Queen Victoria's staff until she died in 1895. His elder sister was Lady Susan Harriet Innes-Ker, who married Sir James Suttie, 6th Baronet.  His younger siblings were Lady Charlotte Isabella Innes-Ker, wife of George Russell, and Lord Charles John Innes-Ker, who married Blanche Mary Williams (a daughter of Col. Thomas Peers Williams).

Career
He served as a Liberal Member of Parliament for Roxburghshire from 1870 to 1874. He also served as Lord Lieutenant of Roxburghshire from 1884 until his death in 1892.

Personal life
On 11 June 1874 he married Anne Emily Spencer-Churchill. She was the fourth daughter of the 7th Duke of Marlborough and the former Lady Frances Vane-Stewart (eldest daughter of Charles Vane, 3rd Marquess of Londonderry). Together, James and Anne, who served as Mistress of the Robes and Lady of the Bedchamber to Queen Victoria, were the parents of seven children, three boys and four girls, including:

 Lady Margaret Frances Susan Innes-Ker (1875–1930), who married James Alexander Orr-Ewing (1857–1900) in 1898.
 Henry John Innes-Ker, 8th Duke of Roxburghe (1876–1932), from whose only son all current Innes-Ker males are descended.
 Lady Victoria Alexandrina Innes-Ker (1877–1970), who married Charles Hyde Villiers (1862–1947) in 1901 and had issue.
 Lady Isabel Innes-Ker (1879–1905), who married the Hon. Guy Greville Wilson (1877–1943) in 1904.
 Lord Alastair Robert Innes-Ker (1880–1936), who married London 10 October 1907 Anne Breese (1885–1959), an American heiress in 1907 and had issue.
 Lady Evelyn Anne Innes-Ker (1882–1958), who married William Fellowes Collins (1865–1948), a grandson of Lord de Ramsey, in 1907 and had issue.
 Lord Robert Edward Innes-Ker (1885–1958), who first married Charlotte Josephine Cooney (1887–1958) (otherwise known as the musical comedy actress Jose Collins) in 1920. They divorced in 1935.  He remarried to Eleanor Marie Woodhead (1887–1958) in 1939; there was no issue by either marriage.

Lord Roxburghe died on 23 October 1892 and was succeeded by his eldest son. His widow, the Dowager Duchess of Roxburghe died in London in 1923 after a lengthy illness, at the home of her daughter Lady Evelyn and her husband, Colonel William Collins.

See also
Duke of Roxburghe

References
Notes

Sources

External links

1839 births
1892 deaths
7
Members of the Parliament of the United Kingdom for Scottish constituencies
UK MPs 1868–1874
UK MPs who inherited peerages
Lord-Lieutenants of Roxburghshire